Mammen Chandy is a former director of Tata Medical Center, Kolkata. Chandy, an alumnus of Christian Medical College Vellore, is a pioneer in the field of bone marrow transplantation in India. He was involved in setting up the first bone marrow transplantation programme in the country at Christian Medical College, Vellore in 1986. In January 2019, Chandy was awarded Padma Shri for his contribution to the field of medicine in 2019.

Biography
Chandy was born on August 30, 1949. Chandy studied medicine and graduated in 1972 with an MBBS. He then completed his MD in internal medicine at Christian Medical College, Vellore in 1975. In 1979, Dr. Chandy was hired as a faculty member at his alma mater. He became Head of the Department of Hematology from 1987 to 2007, before retiring in 2009. 

He did his fellowship in Hematology and Pathology at Westmead Center, Sydney, Australia and obtained his FRACP and FRCPA in 1985. After his fellowship, he rejoined the Department of Medicine in CMC and started his extensive work in the field of hematology.

When he was heading the team, the Department of Hematology was inaugurated as a separate unit in 1986.

Notable medical work
Dr. Chandy introduced the concept of component therapy in blood transfusion and subsequently, insisting that clinicians practise the concept.

He is regarded as a pioneer in developing the field of hematology and bone marrow transplantation in India, starting the Bone Marrow Transplant Programme in 1986.

In Christian Medical College Vellore, Chandy was the first to do a Bone Marrow Transplant on a patient with thalassemia in 1986.

His team developed HLA laboratory, an assay for measuring Busufan levels by using the HPLC method, as well as establishing Diagnostic Molecular Biology tests for blood disorders.

Chandy specialises in aplastic anemia, thalassemia, acute leukaemia, and stem cell transplantation and has published more than 130 scientific articles.

After his retirement from CMC Vellore, Chandy was given another position as the Director of Tata Medical Center, Kolkata, where he set up a bone marrow transplant unit.

To honour his contribution in the field of medicine, Chandy was given various awards including Padma Shri and the Dr. B.C Roy Award by the Medical Council of India.

References

Indian surgeons
Living people
Year of birth missing (living people)
Recipients of the Padma Shri in medicine